Ernst-Erich Hirschfeld (25 August 1918 – 28 July 1944) was a German Luftwaffe fighter pilot during World War II and a recipient of the Knight's Cross of the Iron Cross during World War II of Nazi Germany. During his career he was credited with 24 aerial victories, 23 on the Western Front and 1 on the Eastern Front.

On 28 July 1944, Hirschfeld was killed in action after his parachute failed to open after he bailed out from his damaged Focke Wulf Fw 190 A-8 (Werknummer 171459—factory number) between Gehren and Erfurt. Hirschfeld, who had commanded the 5. Staffel of Jagdgeschwader 300 (JG 300—300th Fighter Wing), was succeeded by Oberleutnant Hans-Joachim Weber. He was posthumously awarded the Knight's Cross on 24 October 1944.

Summary of career

Aerial victory claims
Mathews and Foreman, authors of Luftwaffe Aces — Biographies and Victory Claims, researched the German Federal Archives and found records for 18 aerial victories, plus seven further unconfirmed claims. This figure of confirmed aerial victories includes one claim on the Eastern Front and 17 claims on the Western Front, including more than nine four-engined bombers.

Awards
 Honour Goblet of the Luftwaffe (Ehrenpokal der Luftwaffe) on 15 April 1944 as Leutnant and pilot
 German Cross in Gold on 10 September 1944 as Oberleutnant in the 6./Jagdgeschwader 300
 Knight's Cross of the Iron Cross on 24 October 1944 as Oberleutnant and pilot in the 5./Jagdgeschwader 300.

Notes

References

Citations

Bibliography

 
 
 
 
 
 
 
 
 
 
 

1918 births
1944 deaths
Military personnel from Wrocław
People from the Province of Silesia
Luftwaffe pilots
German World War II flying aces
Recipients of the Gold German Cross
Recipients of the Knight's Cross of the Iron Cross
Luftwaffe personnel killed in World War II
Aviators killed by being shot down